Talvik ( and ) is a village in Alta Municipality in Finnmark county in Norway.  It is located on the western shore of the Altafjorden, along the European route E6 highway. The village is an old trading centre since the 1800s. Talvik Church is located in the village.

The village of Talvik was the administrative centre of the old municipality of Talvik from 1863 until 1964 when it was merged into Alta municipality.

Name
The municipality was named after the old Talvik farm, since Talvik Church was located there. One explanation of the name is that the first element name is derived from the Old Norse word tall meaning "pine" and the last element is víkr meaning "inlet".

Media gallery

References

External links

Alta, Norway
Populated places of Arctic Norway